George Hay (24 August 1729 – 15 October 1811) was a Roman Catholic bishop and writer who served as the Vicar Apostolic of the Lowland District in Scotland from 1778 to 1805.

Born in Edinburgh on 24 August 1729, his parents were members of the Scottish Episcopal Church. Destined for a medical career, young Hay began his studies at the University of Edinburgh. During the Jacobite rising of 1745, when he was sixteen, Hay was summoned to attend wounded soldiers after the battle of Prestonpans. He afterwards followed the victorious Jacobite army of Charles Edward Stuart for some months; but before the decisive fight at Culloden, illness compelled him to return to Edinburgh. He was later arrested for having participated in the rising, and taken to London, where he was kept in custody for twelve months. Here a Catholic bookseller named Neighan gave him his first insight into Catholic teaching, and on his return to Scotland he studied John Gother's work, The Papist Represented and Misrepresented. An introduction to Father Seaton, a Jesuit missionary at Edinburgh, was followed by a prolonged course of instruction, and Hay was received into the Roman Catholic Church, making his first communion on 21 December 1749, at the age of 20.

Debarred by the penal laws from graduating or receiving his medical diploma, he accepted an appointment as surgeon on a trading vessel bound for the Mediterranean. While in London, on his way to join his ship, he became acquainted with Bishop Richard Challoner, Vicar Apostolic of the London District. The result of their intercourse was that Hay determined to enter the priesthood, and on the arrival of his vessel at Marseilles, Hay journeyed to Rome, where he studied in the Scots College for nearly eight years. Among his fellow-students was the future Cardinal Erskine. On 2 April 1758, he was ordained a priest by Cardinal Spinelli, and on his return to Scotland was appointed to assist Bishop Grant in the important district of the Enzie, in Banffshire. In 1766, Bishop Grant succeeded Bishop Smith as the Vicar Apostolic of the Lowland District, and soon afterwards procured the appointment of Hay as his coadjutor. He was consecrated on Trinity Sunday, 21 May 1769 to the titular see of Daulia, succeeding Bishop Grant in 1778 as Vicar Apostolic, and for nearly forty years sustained practically the whole burden of the vicariate.

Bishop Hay's efforts to procure relief for Catholics under the penal laws of the time aroused opposition, and in February 1779, the chapel and house which he had recently built in Edinburgh were burned. The outbreak of the Gordon Riots in England, in 1780, further delayed relief. In 1793, by Act of Parliament some of the most oppressive of the penal laws were lifted.

He made efforts to place the college at Rome under the control of Scottish superiors. His efforts on behalf of the institute in Paris were interrupted by the French Revolution, in which it was swept away. The bishop's last public work was the foundation of a new seminary at Aquhorthies College, in Aberdeenshire, and here, after transferring, with the sanction of Pius VII, the government of the Lowland District to his coadjutor, Bishop Cameron, he died at the age of eighty-two.

Works

George Hay published the first English Catholic Bible printed in Scotland; but the work which secured his own reputation as a religious writer was his cycle of Catholic doctrine entitled The Sincere Christian, The Devout Christian, and The Pious Christian, published 1781–86.

References

Further reading

External links
An Inquiry Whether Salvation Can Be Had Without True Faith, And Out of the Communion of the Church of Christ
 Bp. Hay's works available at archive.org
The Sincere Christian Vol.1
The Sincere Christian Vol. 2
The Devout Christian Vol. 1
The Devout Christian Vol. 2
The Pious Christian
On Miracles Vol. 1
On Miracles Vol. 2
The Sincere Christian instructed in the Faith of Christ, VOL. 1 (Google books)

1729 births
1811 deaths
Converts to Roman Catholicism from Anglicanism
Apostolic vicars of Scotland
18th-century Roman Catholic bishops in Scotland
Scottish surgeons
Scottish publishers (people)
Clergy from Edinburgh
Alumni of the University of Edinburgh
Scottish Jacobites
Scottish religious writers
19th-century Roman Catholic bishops in Scotland
Scottish Roman Catholic bishops